Buccinum glaciale is a species of sea snail, a marine gastropod mollusk in the family Buccinidae, the true whelks.

Description
The size of the ovate-conical shell reaches 90 mm. The shell is of a reddish fawn color or varies from mauve to brown. It is covered with transverse furrows and shows many sharp, spiral lines. The spire is composed of seven or eight whorls, traversed by thick, noduled folds, somewhat oblique, and much less apparent upon the body whorl, which is encircled by one or two very apparent convex keels, which rarely exist upon the upper whorls. The ovate, cream-colored aperture points upwards and is deeply emarginated at its base. The white, thick outer lip is flaring and turns bac. It is and slightly emarginated at its upper part . The siphonal canal is short. The columella is white and waved.

Distribution
This cold-water species is circum-arctic and can be found in the intertidal zone along Japan, Alaska, the arctic zone of Canada, in European waters (Spitzbergen), in the Northwest Atlantic Ocean.

References

 Linnaeus, C. (1761). Fauna Suecica sistens Animalia Sueciae Regni: Mammalia, Aves, Amphibia, Pisces, Insecta, Vermes. Distributa per Classes, Ordines, Genera, Species, cum Differentiis Specierum, Synonymis Auctorum, Nominibus Incolarum, Locis Natalium, Descriptionibus insectorum. Editio altera, auctior. Stockholmiae: L. Salvii, 48 + 578 pp
 Brunel, P., L. Bosse, and G. Lamarche. 1998. Catalogue of the marine invertebrates of the estuary and Gulf of St. Lawrence. Canadian Special Publication of Fisheries and Aquatic Sciences, 126. 405 p
 Gofas, S.; Le Renard, J.; Bouchet, P. (2001). Mollusca, in: Costello, M.J. et al. (Ed.) (2001). European register of marine species: a check-list of the marine species in Europe and a bibliography of guides to their identification. Collection Patrimoines Naturels, 50: pp. 180–213

External links
 CLEMAM
 image of the shell
 

Buccinidae
Gastropods described in 1761
Taxa named by Carl Linnaeus